Endapalli may refer to places in India:

 Endapalli, Karimnagar district, Telangana.
 Endapalli, Krishna district, Andhra Pradesh.
 Endapalli, West Godavari district, Andhra Pradesh.
 Endapalli, Kadapa district, Andhra Pradesh.